Newmarket is a north-west suburb in the City of Brisbane, Queensland, Australia.

Geography

It is an older, mostly residential suburb containing pre-war and post-war homes, including many fine examples of the Queenslander style of home.  Over the last few years, some medium-density townhouses and unit blocks have appeared as well.

History 

Newmarket was originally known as "The Three Mile Scrub" due to its distance from the city, and Ashgrove Avenue, which links Enoggera Road with Waterworks Road to the west, was known as Three Mile Scrub Road. As Brisbane continued to grow northward along Kelvin Grove Road, in about 1880 it was decided to relocated Brisbane's livestock saleyards from Normanby to an outer location, the area now bordered by Enoggera Road, Newmarket Road, Wilston Road and Alderson Street. This area became known as the "new market" given the suburb its name. The new sale yards were serviced by Newmarket railway station after the rail line was extended from Mayne Junction in 1899.

In 1900, local residents were agitating to have the Kelvin Grove tramway extended along Enoggera Road to the Newmarket Hotel. However, a new bridge over Enoggera Creek would be required. Also there were concerns that the close proximity of the proposed tramway would take revenue away from the railway line. However these concerns were resolved and the tramway extension to the Newmarket Hotel was opened on Monday 27 July 1903.

On Saturday 20 April 1901, Bishop William Webber laid the foundation stone of St James' Anglican Church. The church was designed by architects John H. Buckeridge and Hall & Dods and built by G. Marshall and could seat 120 people. It was dedicated on Sunday 20 July 1901 by Bishop Webber. It is located at 58 Enoggera Road.

Newmarket State School opened on 4 July 1904.

The brickwords were demolished in 1987 but the Newmarket Brickworks chimney remains and is now heritage-listed. However, due to changes in the suburb boundaries, the chimney is now officially in the neighbouring suburb of Alderley.

The Ruby Estate, Kelvin Grove (now known as Newmarket), being re-subdivision of subdivision 43 of suburban portion, 25 parish of Enoggera were auctioned on site by G.T Bell Auctioneer on 22 August 1914, at 3pm. The terms of the sale required a £2 deposit and £1 per month per lot with the interest rate at 5%. The 22 building sites situated between Foster street and Ruby street, Kelvin Grove (Newmarket) Brisbane, were advertised as consisting of 16 perches and two minutes from the Kelvin Grove tram terminus. The original advertisement showed that between blocks 2 and 3 held a house on site, for removal. The following Monday 24 August 1914, it was published in The Telegraph newspaper, that 16 allotments of the Ruby Estate, Kelvin Grove (Newmarket) were sold during the auction.

In about March 1918 a block of land was purchased for £100 to build a Baptist church in Newmarket/Grange. The church opened on Saturday 21 June 1919. The church was at 197 Wilston Road (corner of Carberry Street) in the suburb of Grange and is known as Grange Baptist Church.

The sale of the McCook Estate, at the time part of the suburb Kelvin Grove, now Newmarket, by Auctioneers, Martin Snelling & Co, occurred on 3 March 1928 at 3 pm on the grounds. It was offered again for sale by auction on 14 April 1928. The Estate comprised 19 splendid business and residential sites, located on the corner of Kelvin Grove Road and Parker street and backing onto Foster street. The advertisement stressed the convenience of location on the tram-line, within 15 minutes ride to the GPO and close to the shopping centre, picture theatre, churches and state schools.

As urban development continued in Newmarket, the saleyards were moved to Cannon Hill in 1931. Evidence of the saleyards can still be seen in a number of narrow laneways including one known as Saleyards Lane, most likely old cattle tracks between stockyards, that still exist in this neighbourhood.

St Ambrose's Catholic School opened in 1936.

Newmarket State High School opened on 29 January 1963 and closed on 13 December 1996. it was located immediately west of Newmarket State School, extending from Brent Street south towards Banks Street. The school's site has been redeveloped for housing with the creation of Nelson Place, Laurence Street, and Daniel Place.

Until December 1968 trams operated by the Brisbane City Council plied along Enoggera Road.  A former tramway electrical substation still stands on the corner of Kate Street and Enoggera Road and has been transformed into a contemporary dwelling.

The median age of the Newmarket population was 32 years of age, 5 years below the Australian median. 76% of people living in Newmarket were born in Australia, compared to the national average of 69.8%; the next most common countries of birth were England 3.4%, New Zealand 2.6%, India 1.9%, China 1.2%, Korea, Republic of 0.7%. 85.6% of people spoke only English at home; the next most common languages were 1.1% Mandarin, 1% Italian, 0.7% Cantonese, 0.7% Spanish, 0.6% Korean.

Heritage listings

Newmarket has a number of heritage-listed sites, including:

 Bearsden (Victorian-era Queenslander house): 10 Bearsden Avenue
 Nahoun (World War I bungalow): 20 Davidson Street
 Corinthia – St Ambrose's Catholic Precinct (also known as St. Ambrose's Presbytery): 23 Davidson Street
 Federation-era Queenslander house : 15 Edgar Street
 Ivy Cottage (also known as Glengyte): 102 Edmondstone Street
 Monahilla (also known as Rosie's Boarding House): 4 Enoggera Road
 Victorian-era Queenslander house: 12 Enoggera Road
 Former Kelvin Grove Methodist/Uniting Church: 36 Enoggera Road
 St James' Anglican Church and Rectory: 58 Enoggera Road
 Newmarket Memorial Hall: 92 Enoggera Road
 Newmarket State School: 320 Enoggera Road
 Former Newmarket Police Station & residence (also known as Enoggera police residence): 334 Enoggera Road
 Substation No. 238: 306 Newmarket Road
 Newmarket Air Raid Shelter: outside 320 Enoggera Road
 Wilston House: 47 Watson Street:
 Newmarket railway station: 79A Wilston Road
 Victorian-era Queenslander house: 170 Wilston Road
 Newmarket-Grange Progress Association: 187 Wilston Road
 Wilston railway station: 339A Newmarket Road

Education
Newmarket State School is a government primary (Prep-6) school for boys and girls at 15 Banks Street. In 2017, the school had an enrollment of 263 students with 26 teachers (17 full-time equivalent) and 17 non-teaching staff (10 full-time equivalent). In 2018, the school had an enrolment of 279 students with 26 teachers (18 full-time equivalent) and 17 non-teaching staff (10 full-time equivalent).

St Ambrose's Primary School is a Catholic primary (Prep-6) school for boys and girls at 23 Davidson Street. In 2017, the school had an enrollment of 273 students with 20 teachers (16 full-time equivalent) and 13 non-teaching staff (7 full-time equivalent). In 2018, the school had an enrolment of 254 students with 20 teachers (16 full-time equivalent) and 11 non-teaching staff (7 full-time equivalent).

Brisbane Urban Environmental Education Centre is an Outdoor and Environmental Education Centre at 15 Banks Street.

There are no secondary schools in Newmarket. The nearest government secondary school is Kelvin Grove State College in neighbouring Kelvin Grove to the south.

Amenities 
Newmarket offers a number of options to locals and nearby residents.  The Brisbane City Council operates a public swimming pool in Sedgeley Park, on Alderson Street. Enoggera Creek, which forms the southern boundary of Newmarket, contains a linear park and bikeway. The suburb has several sporting ovals, including Spencer Park, which is home to former NSL and current Brisbane Premier League team Brisbane City Football Club and Windsor Royals Baseball Club, and McCook Park, which is home to Newmarket SFC soccer club.

The first stage of the Newmarket Shopping Centre opened in 2005.  The shopping centre contains a Coles supermarket, post office, Commonwealth Bank of Australia branch, newsagent and several specialty stores.   The historic Newmarket Hotel, established 1897, has been completely renovated and is now a buzzing hive of activity most nights of the week.  Both the Newmarket Hotel and shopping centre are located on the corner of Newmarket Road and Enoggera Road, at Newmarket. Brisbane Mexican cuisine pioneers Pepe's Mexican Restaurant moved to Newmarket in 2006. In 2018, the southern end of the center was refurbished in order to create space for the recently built Newmarket cinemas and nearby restaurants.

Transport 

Via Train, Newmarket Railway Station provides access to regular Queensland Rail City network services on the Ferny Grove railway line arranging travel to the Brisbane CBD, Beenleigh and Ferny Grove.

Via Bus, Newmarket is serviced by Brisbane Transport buses to Chermside, Mitchelton and to The City.

Via Road, Newmarket's main arterials are Enoggera Road which is the main corridor for motorists travelling to The City and Alderley, as well as Newmarket Road which is the main corridor for motorists travelling to Lutwyche.

References

External links

 
 
 

 
Suburbs of the City of Brisbane